Kunti is a female character in the Sanskrit epic Mahābhārata. It may also refer to: 
Kunti Kingdom
A name for the sculpture (Untitled) Blue Lady